Cuneane (systematic name: pentacyclo[3.3.0.02,4.03,7.06,8]octane) is a saturated hydrocarbon with the formula  and a 3D structure resembling a wedge, hence the name. Cuneane may be produced from cubane by metal-ion-catalyzed σ-bond rearrangement. Similar reactions are known for homocubane and bishomocubane.

Molecular geometry 
The carbon atoms in the cuneane molecule form a hexahedron with point group C2v.
The cuneane molecule has three groups of equivalent carbon atoms (A, B, C), which have also been confirmed by NMR. The molecular graph of the carbon skeleton of cuneane is a regular graph with non-equivalent groups of vertices, and so it is a very important test object for different algorithms of mathematical chemistry.

Derivatives 
Some cuneane derivatives have liquid crystal properties.

References

Polycyclic nonaromatic hydrocarbons
Cyclopropanes
Cyclobutanes